Historical Society Somerset Hills (THSSH) is a historical organization in Somerset County, New Jersey, United States. It was founded in 1928 as the Historical Society of Basking Ridge.

COVID-19 UPDATE: 
The society closed its doors in 2019 awaiting COVID-19 public protocol adoption. No groups, members or outside organizations are permitted in the Brick Academy as it will remain closed until further notice.

History 
The Historical Society of the Somerset Hills is based at the Brick Academy and is the nickname for a Federal-style brick building built in 1809 to meet the growing needs of the Basking Ridge Classical School located in the Basking Ridge section of Bernards Township. It is the oldest standing school in the area and existed prior to 1799, at least 10 years before the construction of this building in 1809.

The brick building was constructed by local Presbyterian pastor, Rev. Robert Finley.  This was about halfway through Rev. Finley's time at Basking Ridge.  During the time he ran the school, attendance grew from fewer than 12 to an average near 25 students, and sometimes as high as 40 students.  Students came from near & far, mostly from prominent families. The school was a high end preparatory school for boys who generally continued on to the College of New Jersey, later (in 1896), known as Princeton University. In 1817, Rev. Finley quit Basking Ridge to briefly become president of the University of Georgia in Athens, GA.  By 1828, the "Brick Academy" corporation was formed and the building continued use as a private, then public school in 1853, before being used for other purposes.

In 1968, the Board of Trustees made the decision to expand its historic representation to include not just Basking Ridge, but the entire Somerset Hills community. A number of Somerset County and State grants have been approved for the restoration of the facility, most recently being the third floor school room. The latest grant application was approved in 2014 to replace the roof which is expected to be completed in 2018.

THSSH has a 100-year lease with Bernards Township to house their organization at the Brick Academy. In return, THSSH is responsible for maintaining the property and opening the facility to the public. on a regular basis.

In 2019 due to the COVID-19 breakout the organization closed its doors restricting activities to the Board of Directors only. Most of the key Board Members had resigned the previous year due to mismanagement of the by-laws and mission.

Historic Timeline 
 1928 Bernards Township, New Jersey The Historical Society of Basking Ridge is founded 
 1948 Bernards Township buys the Brick Academy building for continued use for municipal offices 
 1975 Bernards Township government moves to former Astor estate at 1 Collyer Lane 
 1976 Township leases Brick Academy to The Historical Society of the Somerset Hills 
 1976 Brick Academy listed on National Register of Historic Places 
 1978  50th Anniversary celebrating the founding of The Historical Society of the Somerset Hills 
 2008 Dedication and opening of the top floor of the Brick Academy restoration effort. (November 11, 2008)
 2003  75th Anniversary celebrating the founding of The Historical Society of the Somerset Hills 
 2009 Brick Academy 200 year Bicentennial celebration 
 2028 100th Anniversary celebrating the founding of The Historical Society of the Somerset Hills (Basking Ridge Historical Society)

Notable Friends/Graduates of the Brick Academy
 1928 Founding executive committee: Mrs. Monroe.F. Ellis - President, Ned O. Howlett - Vice President, Mrs. R. A. Everett - Rec. Secretary, Miss Nettie Allen - Cor. Secretary, Miss Mary Vorhees - Treasurer.
 Samuel Lewis Southard (1787-1842), served as U.S. Senator, Secretary of the Navy, and the 10th Governor of New Jersey
 Theodore Frelinghuysen, United States Senator, Whig candidate for Vice President in 1844, and president of Rutgers College
 William Lewis Dayton, United States Senator, Republican candidate for Vice President in 1856, and Minister to France during the Civil War
 Commodore Robert Field Stockton, hero of the Mexican War

References

External links
The Historical Society of the Somerset Hills
Non-Profit Mr. Local History Project spins off severing ties to Historical Society of Somerset Hills

Bernards Township, New Jersey
Historical societies in New Jersey